Trichodes ornatus, commonly known as Ornate Checkered Beetle, is a beetle species of checkered beetles belonging to the family Cleridae, subfamily Clerinae which can be found only in North America.

Ecology
Larvae live in bee nests of mostly Megachilidae family species and are parasitic. While in the nest they feed on the bees' larvae or pollen. When they mature into an adult they begin feeding on yarrow, milkweed, and other plants of yellow colouration.

References

External links
Trichodes ornatus images

ornatus
Beetles of North America
Beetles described in 1943
Parasites of bees